The Pingtung Hakka Cultural Museum is a museum about Hakka people in Zhutian Township, Pingtung County, Taiwan.

History
The museum was opened in 2001.

Architecture
The museum building was built with Hakka architectural layout over two floors in a cage layout. The exhibition areas are divided into the Hakka cultivation, Hakka farm life, Hakka life, Hakka culture and heritage.

Transportation
The museum is accessible within walking distance north west of Xishi Station of Taiwan Railways.

See also
 List of museums in Taiwan

References

2001 establishments in Taiwan
Hakka museums in Taiwan
Museums established in 2001
Museums in Pingtung County